Jaime Duque (2 June 1931 – 4 May 1980) was a Colombian épée, foil and sabre fencer. He competed in three events at the 1960 Summer Olympics.

References

External links
 

1931 births
1980 deaths
People from Líbano, Tolima
Colombian male épée fencers
Olympic fencers of Colombia
Fencers at the 1960 Summer Olympics
Colombian male foil fencers
Colombian male sabre fencers
20th-century Colombian people